The People's Liberation Party (HKP) is a Marxist–Leninist communist party in Turkey. The HKP is based strongly around Hikmet Kıvılcımlı's ideas and philosophy.

The party was established on 15 June 2005, the 35th anniversary of the 15–16 June Worker Resistance.

Hikmet Kıvılcımlı (1902–1971), who was a guerilla commander in the Turkish War of Independence when he was 17, devoted his life to the struggle of the working class, and the HKP is led by his example and political thought and theory.

Nurullah Ankut, a retired philosophy teacher from Konya, has been the head of the party since 2005.

HKP gained the right to participate in elections in the Turkish local elections of 2014, and they received a total of 26,654 votes. HKP participated in the Turkish general elections of June 2015 with 550 candidate from 85 voting section. They received a total of 60,396 votes or 0.13%. In the November 2015 elections the party won 83,057 votes (0.17%).

Election results

General Elections

Local elections

See also 

 List of political parties in Turkey

References

External links
 

2005 establishments in Turkey
Anti-imperialist organizations
Communist parties in Turkey
Far-left politics in Turkey
Political parties established in 2005